Orthetrum camerunense is a species of dragonfly in family Libellulidae. It is found in Cameroon, Central African Republic, Kenya, Nigeria, Uganda, and possibly Tanzania. Its natural habitats are subtropical or tropical moist lowland forests, subtropical or tropical moist montane forests, and rivers.

References

Libellulidae
Taxonomy articles created by Polbot